Brederwiede is a former municipality in the Dutch province of Overijssel. It was created in a merger of Blokzijl, Giethoorn, Vollenhove, and Wanneperveen in 1973, and existed until it became a part of Steenwijk in 2001 (since 2003: Steenwijkerland).

References

Municipalities of the Netherlands disestablished in 2001
Former municipalities of Overijssel
Steenwijkerland